The 2001 Boston Red Sox season was the 101st season in the franchise's Major League Baseball history. The Red Sox finished second in the American League East with a record of 82 wins and 79 losses,  games behind the New York Yankees, who went on to win the AL championship. The Red Sox did not qualify for the postseason, as the AL wild card went to the Oakland Athletics, who had finished second in the American League West with a record of 102–60.

Offseason 
 November 16, 2000: Chris Stynes was traded by the Cincinnati Reds to the Boston Red Sox for Michael Coleman and Donnie Sadler.
 December 2000: Manny Ramirez signed as a free agent with the Boston Red Sox.
 January 11, 2001: David Cone signed as a free agent with the Boston Red Sox.
 January 19, 2001: Craig Grebeck was signed as a free agent with the Boston Red Sox.

Regular season

Season standings

Record vs. opponents

Transactions 
 April 18, 2001: Bill Pulsipher was signed as a free agent with the Boston Red Sox.
 June 5, 2001: Kevin Youkilis was drafted by the Boston Red Sox in the 8th round of the 2001 amateur draft. Player signed June 11, 2001.
 June 12, 2001: Justin Duchscherer was traded by the Boston Red Sox to the Texas Rangers for Doug Mirabelli.
 July 2, 2001: Joe Oliver was signed as a free agent with the Boston Red Sox.
 July 31, 2001: Ugueth Urbina was traded by the Montreal Expos to the Boston Red Sox for Tomokazu Ohka and Rich Rundles (minors).
 August 23, 2001: Bill Pulsipher was selected off waivers by the Chicago White Sox from the Boston Red Sox.

Famous Firsts involving the Red Sox 
 Monday, August 6, 2001 – Scott Hatteberg became the first player to hit into a triple play and hit a grand slam during the same game.
 Sunday, September 2, 2001 – This was the first day in Major League history where the final score in four games was 1-0: Yankees 1 vs. Red Sox 0, Padres 1 vs. Diamondbacks 0, Astros 1 vs. Brewers 0, and Blue Jays 1 vs. Tigers 0.

Opening Day Line Up

Roster

Player stats

Batting

Starters by position 
Note: Pos = Position; G = Games played; AB = At bats; H = Hits; Avg. = Batting average; HR = Home runs; RBI = Runs batted in; SB = Stolen bases

Other batters 
Note: G = Games played; AB = At bats; H = Hits; Avg. = Batting average; HR = Home runs; RBI = Runs batted in; SB = Stolen bases

Pitching

Starting pitchers 
Note: G = Games pitched; GS = Games started; IP = Innings pitched; W = Wins; L = Losses; SV = Saves; ERA = Earned run average; SO = Strikeouts

Other pitchers 
Note: G = Games pitched; IP = Innings pitched; W = Wins; L = Losses; SV = Saves; ERA = Earned run average; SO = Strikeouts

Relief pitchers 
Note: G = Games pitched; GS = Games started; IP = Innings pitched; W = Wins; L = Losses; SV = Saves; ERA = Earned run average; SO = Strikeouts

Game log 

|- style="text-align:center; background-color:#fbb;"
| 1 || April 2 || @ Orioles  || 1–2 (11) || Kohlmeier (1–0) || Lowe (0–1) || — || Camden Yards || 46,547 || 0–1 || L1
|- style="text-align:center; background-color:#bfb;"
| 2 || April 4 || @ Orioles  || 3–0 || Nomo (1–0) || Ponson (0–1) || — || Camden Yards || 35,602  || 1–1 || W1
|- style="text-align:center; background-color:#fbb;"
| 3 || April 5 || @ Orioles  || 1–2 || Groom (1–0)  || Lowe (0–2) || — || Camden Yards || 33,469 || 1–2 || L1
|- style="text-align:center; background-color:#bfb;"
| 4 || April 6 || Devil Rays  || 11–4 || Wakefield (1–0)  || Rupe (0–1)  || — || Fenway Park || 33,525 || 2–2 || W1
|- style="text-align:center; background-color:#bfb;"
| 5 || April 7 || Devil Rays || 6–2 || Crawford (1–0) || Harper (0–1) || — || Fenway Park || 31,660 || 3–2 || W2
|- style="text-align:center; background-color:#bfb;"
| 6 || April 8 || Devil Rays  || 3–0 || Martínez (1–0) || Lopez (1–1) || Lowe (1) || Fenway Park || 31,383 || 4–2 || W3
|- style="text-align:center; background-color:#bfb;"
| 7 || April 10 || Orioles  || 10–1 || Nomo (2–0) || Ponson (0–2) || Wakefield (1) || Fenway Park || 27,664 || 5–2 || W4
|- style="text-align:center; background-color:#fbb;"
| 8 || April 11 || Orioles  || 4–5  || Roberts (1–0) || Castillo (0–1) || Groom (1) || Fenway Park || 26,302 || 5–3 || L1
|- style="text-align:center; background-color:#bfb"
| 9 || April 12 || Orioles || 8–2 || Ohka (1–0) || Mercedes (0–2) || Arrojo (1) || Fenway Park || 30,083 || 6–3 || W1
|- style="text-align:center; background-color:#bfb"
| 10 || April 13 || Yankees || 3–2 (10)|| Lowe (1–2) || Rivera (0–1) || — || Fenway Park || 33,124 || 7–3 || W2
|- style="text-align:center; background-color:#fbb"
| 11 || April 14 || Yankees || 2–3 || Stanton (1–0) || Schourek (0–1) || Rivera (3) || Fenway Park || 33,396 || 7–4 || L1
|- style="text-align:center; background-color:#bfb"
| 12 || April 15 || Yankees || 5–4 || Garcés (1–0) || Pettitte (2–1) || Arrojo (2) || Fenway Park || 32,127 || 8–4 || W1
|- style="text-align:center; background-color:#bfb"
| 13 || April 16 || Yankees || 4–1 || Castillo (1–1) || Mussina (1–1) || Beck (1) || Fenway Park || 33,373 || 9–4 || W2
|- style="text-align:center; background-color:#bfb"
| 14 || April 17 || @ Devil Rays || 10–0 || Ohka (2–0) || Harper (0–2) || — || Tropicana Field || 19,433 || 10–4 || W3
|- style="text-align:center; background-color:#bfb"
| 15 || April 18 || @ Devil Rays || 9–1 || Arrojo (1–0) || Sturtze (0–2) || — || Tropicana Field || 16,622 || 11–4 || W4
|- style="text-align:center; background-color:#bfb;"
| 16 || April 19 || @ Devil Rays || 8–3 || Martínez (2–0) || Wilson (0–2) || Lowe (2) || Tropicana Field || 22,026 || 12–4 || W5
|- style="text-align:center; background-color:#fbb;"
| 17 || April 20 || @ Yankees || 1–6 || Pettitte (3–1) || Nomo (2–1) || — || Yankee Stadium || 54,366 || 12–5 || L1
|- style="text-align:center; background-color:#bfb;"
| 18 || April 21 || @ Yankees || 8–3 || Castillo (2–1) || Mussina (1–2) || — || Yankee Stadium || 55,483 || 13–5 || W1
|- style="text-align:center; background-color:#fbb;"
| 19 || April 22 || @ Yankees || 3–4 (10) || Rivera (1–1) || Lowe (1–3) || — || Yankee Stadium || 55,278 || 13–6 || L1
|- style="text-align:center; background-color:#bfb;"
| 20 || April 24 || Twins  || 9–4 || Crawford (2–0) || Redman (1–2) || Wakefield (2) || Fenway Park || 32,557 || 14–6 || W1
|- style="text-align:center; background-color:#fbb;"
| 21 || April 25 || Twins || 6–4 (10)|| Wells (2–0) || Beck (0–1) || Hawkins (6) || Fenway Park || 33,177 || 14–7 || L1
|- style="text-align:center; background-color:#bfb;"
| 22 || April 26 || Twins || 2–0 || Nomo (3–1) || Milton (3–1) || Lowe (3) || Fenway Park || 32,222 || 15–7 || W1
|- style="text-align:center; background-color:#bfb;"
| 23 || April 27 || Royals  || 9–2 || Castillo (3–1) || Stein (1–3) || Arrojo (3) || Fenway Park || 31,850 || 16–7 || W2
|- style="text-align:center; background-color:#fbb;"
| 24 || April 28 || Royals  || 2–8 || Reichert (3–1) || Ohka (2–1) || — || Fenway Park || 32,442 || 16–8 || L1
|- style="text-align:center; background-color:#fbb;"
| 25 || April 29 || Royals  || 8–11 (11) || Santiago (1–0) || Lowe (1–4) || Hernández  (5) || Fenway Park || 32,791 || 16–9 || L2
|-

|- style="text-align:center; background-color:#bfb"
| 26 || May 1 || @ Mariners || 2–0 || Martínez (3–0) || Halama (2–2) || Arrojo (4) || Safeco Field || 36,642 || 17–9 || W1
|- style="text-align:center; background-color:#fbb"
| 27 || May 2 || @ Mariners || 1–5 || Sele (5–0) || Nomo (3–2) || — || Safeco Field || 40,170 || 17–10 || L1 
|- style="text-align:center; background-color:#fbb;"
| 28 || May 3 || @ Mariners || 3–10 || Moyer (5–0) || Castillo (3–2) || — || Safeco Field || 32,513 || 17–11 || L2 
|- style="text-align:center; background-color:#fbb;"
| 29 || May 4 || @ Athletics || 3–7 || Heredia (2–4) || Lowe (1–5) || Tam (1) || Network Associates Coliseum || 20,631 || 17–12 || L3 
|- style="text-align:center; background-color:#bfb;"
| 30 || May 5 || @ Athletics || 7–1 || Crawford (3–0) || Zito (3–3) || — || Network Associates Coliseum || 29,248 || 18–12 || W1 
|- style="text-align:center; background-color:#bfb;"
| 31 || May 6 || @ Athletics || 5–4 || Martínez (4–0) || Lidle (0–2) || Beck (2) || Network Associates Coliseum || 40,186 || 19–12 || W2 
|- style="text-align:center; background-color:#bfb;"
| 32 || May 8 || Mariners || 12–4 || Nomo (4–2) || Moyer (5–1) || — || Fenway Park || 32,941 || 20–12 || W3 
|- style="text-align:center; background-color:#fbb;"
| 33 || May 9 || Mariners || 5–10 || Nelson (1–0) || Arrojo (1–1) || Sasaki (15) || Fenway Park || 31,616 || 20–13 || L1 
|- style="text-align:center; background-color:#fbb;"
| 34 || May 10 || Mariners || 2–5 || Halama (3–3) || Ohka (2–2) || Sasaki (16) || Fenway Park || 31,428 || 20–14 || L2
|- style="text-align:center; background-color:#fbb;"
| 35 || May 11 || Athletics || 6–7 || Isringhausen (1–1) || Beck (0–2) || Tam (2) || Fenway Park || 32,718 || 20–15 || L3 
|- style="text-align:center; background-color:#bfb;"
| 36 || May 12 || Athletics || 9–3 ||Martínez (5–0) || Heredia (2–5) || — || Fenway Park || 32,686 || 21–15 || W1 
|- style="text-align:center; background-color:#bfb;"
| 37 || May 13 || Athletics || 5–4 (11)|| Lowe (2–5) || Tam (0–1) || — || Fenway Park || 31,926 || 22–15 || W2 
|- style="text-align:center; background-color:#bfb"
| 38 || May 15 || @ Twins || 5–2 || Castillo (4–2) || Redman (2–4) || — || Metrodome || 15,332 || 23–15 || W3 
|- style="text-align:center; background-color:#fbb"
| 39 || May 16 || @ Twins || 3–4 || Wells (3–0) || Schourek (0–2) || Hawkins (13) || Metrodome || 22,006 || 23–16 || L1 
|- style="text-align:center; background-color:#fbb"
| 40 || May 17 || @ Twins || 3–5 || Radke (7–1) || Arrojo (1–2) || — || Metrodome || 18,466 || 23–17 || L2 
|- style="text-align:center; background-color:#bfb"
| 41 || May 18 || @ Royals || 6–3 || Martínez (6–0) || Stein (1–4) || — || Kaufmann Stadium || 34,154 || 24–17 || W1 
|- style="text-align:center; background-color:#fbb"
| 42 || May 19 || @ Royals || 2–6 || Reichert (4–4) || Nomo (4–3) || — || Kaufmann Stadium || 26,853 || 24–18 || L1
|- style="text-align:center; background-color:#bfb"
| 43 || May 20 || @ Royals || 10–3 || Castillo (5–2) || Meadows (1–5) || — || Kaufmann Stadium || 18,596 || 25–18 || W1
|- style="text-align:center; background-color:#bbb"
| — || May 22 || @ Yankees  || colspan=8|Postponed (rain). Makeup date June 4.
|- style="text-align:center; background-color:#fbb"
| 44 || May 23 || @ Yankees || 3–7 || Pettitte (5–3) || Cone (0–1) || — || Yankee Stadium || 44,108 || 25–19 || L1 
|- style="text-align:center; background-color:#fbb;"
| 45 || May 24 || @ Yankees || 1–2 || Mussina (5–4) || Martínez (6–1) || Rivera (13) || Yankee Stadium || 55,592 || 25–20 || L2 
|- style="text-align:center; background-color:#bfb;"
| 46 || May 25 || Blue Jays || 4–0 || Nomo (5–3) || Loaiza (4–5) || — || Fenway Park || 32,912 || 26–20 || W1 
|- style="text-align:center; background-color:#fbb;"
| 47 || May 26 || Blue Jays || 0–5 || Michalak (5–3) || Castillo (5–3) || — || Fenway Park || 31,035 || 26–21 || L1 
|- style="text-align:center; background-color:#bfb"
| 48 || May 27 || Blue Jays || 4–2 || Wakefield (2–0) || Parris (3–4) || Lowe (4) || Fenway Park || 31,420 || 27–21 || W1 
|- style="text-align:center; background-color:#fbb"
| 49 || May 28 || Yankees || 3–4 || Pettitte (6–3) || Schourek (0–3) || Rivera (15) || Fenway Park || 33,125 || 27–22 || L1 
|- style="text-align:center; background-color:#bfb"
| 50 || May 29 || Yankees || 3–0 || Martínez (7–1) || Mussina (5–5) || Lowe (5) || Fenway Park || 33,711 || 28–22 || W1 
|- style="text-align:center; background-color:#bfb"
| 51 || May 31 || @ Blue Jays || 11–5 || Beck (1–2) || Escobar (0–4) || — || SkyDome || 21,747 || 29–22 || W2 
|-

|- style="text-align:center; background-color:#bfb;"
| 52 || June 1 || @ Blue Jays || 6–4 (11)|| Lowe (3–5) || Koch (0–2) || — || SkyDome || 21,564 || 30–22 || W3 
|- style="text-align:center; background-color:#bfb;"
| 53 || June 2 || @ Blue Jays || 2–1 || Schourek (1–3) || Plesac (0–2) || Beck (3) || SkyDome || 24,603 || 31–22 || W4
|- style="text-align:center; background-color:#bfb;"
| 54 || June 3 || @ Blue Jays || 5–4 || Pichardo (1–0) || Carpenter (5–3) || Lowe (6) || SkyDome || 24,643 || 32–22 || W5
|- style="text-align:center; background-color:#fbb"
| 55 || June 4 || @ Yankees || 6–7 || Rivera (2–3) || Beck (1–3) || — || Yankee Stadium || 41,771 || 32–23 || L1
|- style="text-align:center; background-color:#bfb"
| 56 || June 5 || Tigers || 4–3 (18)|| Wakefield (3–0) || Borkowski (0–2) || — || Fenway Park || 32,814 || 33–23 || W1 
|- style="text-align:center; background-color:#fbb"
| 57 || June 6 || Tigers || 3–7 || Mlicki (4–6) || Castillo (5–4) || Anderson (2) || Fenway Park || 32,794 || 33–24 || L1 
|- style="text-align:center; background-color:#bfb"
| 58 || June 7 || Tigers || 8–1 || Wakefield (4–0) || Santos (1–2) || Arrojo (5) || Fenway Park || 32,132 || 34–24 || W1
|- style="text-align:center; background-color:#bfb"
| 59 || June 8 || Phillies || 3–2 || Cone (1–1) || Wolf (4–6) || Lowe (7) || Fenway Park || 33,435 || 35–24 || W2 
|- style="text-align:center; background-color:#fbb"
| 60 || June 9 || Phillies || 2–5 || Daal (7–1) || Martínez (7–2) || Mesa (17) || Fenway Park || 32,944 || 35–25 || L1
|- style="text-align:center; background-color:#bfb;"
| 61 || June 10 || Phillies || 5–4 || Nomo (6–3) || Cormier (3–1) || Lowe (8) || Fenway Park || 32,767 || 36–25 || W1
|- style="text-align:center; background-color:#bfb;"
| 62 || June 12 || Marlins || 4–2 || Castillo (6–4) || Dempster (6–7) || Lowe (9) || Fenway Park || 32,816 || 37–25 || W2
|- style="text-align:center; background-color:#fbb;"
| 63 || June 13 || Marlins || 2–4 || Clement (3–5) || Wakefield (4–1) || Alfonseca (13) || Fenway Park || 31,637 || 37–26 || L1
|- style="text-align:center; background-color:#bfb;"
| 64 || June 14 || Marlins || 6–4 || Cone (2–1) || Smith (3–2) || Beck (4) || Fenway Park || 33,225 || 38–26 || W1 
|- style="text-align:center; background-color:#bfb;"
| 65 || June 15 || @ Braves || 9–5 (10)|| Beck (2–3) || Cabrera (4–2) || — || Turner Field || 48,469 || 39–26 || W2
|- style="text-align:center; background-color:#fbb;"
| 66 || June 16 || @ Braves || 0–8 || Burkett (6–5) || Nomo (6–4) || — || Turner Field || 50,524 || 39–27 || L1
|- style="text-align:center; background-color:#bfb;"
| 67 || June 17 || @ Braves || 4–3 || Castillo (7–4) || Pérez (4–5) || Lowe (10) || Turner Field || 45,362 || 40–27 || W1
|- style="text-align:center; background-color:#bfb;"
| 68 || June 19 || @ Devil Rays || 5–4 || Wakefield (5–1) || Rekar (1–8) || Lowe (11) || Tropicana Field || 12,550 || 41–27 || W2 
|- style="text-align:center; background-color:#bfb;"
| 69 || June 20 || @ Devil Rays || 8–2 || Garcés (2–0) || Rupe (4–6) || — || Tropicana Field || 12,520 || 42–27 || W3
|- style="text-align:center; background-color:#bfb;"
| 70 || June 21 || @ Devil Rays || 7–4 || Beck (3–3) || Yan (2–3) || Lowe (12) || Tropicana Field || 15,603 || 43–27 || W4
|- style="text-align:center; background-color:#fbb"
| 71 || June 22 || Blue Jays || 3–4 || Borbón (2–3) || Schourek (1–4) || Koch (12) || Fenway Park || 33,844 || 43–28 || L1
|- style="text-align:center; background-color:#fbb"
| 72 || June 23 || Blue Jays || 6–9 || File (3–1) || Castillo (7–5) || Koch (13) || Fenway Park || 33,266 || 43–29 || L2 
|- style="text-align:center; background-color:#fbb"
| 73 || June 24 || Blue Jays || 2–5 || Plesac (1–2) || Wakefield (5–2) || Koch (14) || Fenway Park || 32,804 || 43–30 || L3
|- style="text-align:center; background-color:#bfb"
| 74 || June 25 || Devil Rays || 12–8 || Cone (3–1) || Rupe (4–7) || Lowe (13) || Fenway Park || 32,854 || 44–30 || W1
|- style="text-align:center; background-color:#bfb"
| 75 || June 26 || Devil Rays || 7–6 || Beck (4–3) || Zambrano (0–1) || Lowe (14) || Fenway Park || 32,185 || 45–30 || W2
|- style="text-align:center; background-color:#fbb"
| 76 || June 27 || Devil Rays || 7–9 || Creek (2–1) || Schourek (1–5) || — || Fenway Park || 33,216 || 45–31 || L1
|- style="text-align:center; background-color:#fbb;"
| 77 || June 28 || Devil Rays || 3–4 || Colomé (1–0) || Lowe (3–6) || — || Fenway Park || 33,433 || 45–32 || L2
|- style="text-align:center; background-color:#fbb;"
| 78 || June 29 || @ Blue Jays || 4–8 || Quantrill (7–1) || Florie (0–1) || — || SkyDome || 23,055 || 45–33 || L3
|- style="text-align:center; background-color:#bfb;"
| 79 || June 30 || @ Blue Jays || 7–5 || Cone (4–1) || Hamilton (3–6) || — || SkyDome || 28,543 || 46–33 || W1
|-

|- style="text-align:center; background-color:#bfb;"
| 80 || July 1 || @ Blue Jays || 4–0 || Arrojo (2–2) || Carpenter (7–5) || — || SkyDome || 34,348 || 47–33 || W2
|- style="text-align:center; background-color:#bfb"
| 81 || July 2 || @ Blue Jays || 16–4 || Nomo (7–4) || Loaiza (5–9) || — || SkyDome || 38,237 || 48–33 || W3
|- style="text-align:center; background-color:#fbb"
| 82 || July 3 || @ Indians  || 1–9 || Westbrook (2–0) || Ohka (2–3) || — || Jacobs Field || 42,520 || 48–34 || L1
|- style="text-align:center; background-color:#bfb"
| 83 || July 4 || @ Indians  || 13–4 || Wakefield (6–2) || Burba (8–6) || — || Jacobs Field || 42,382 || 49–34 || W1
|- style="text-align:center; background-color:#bfb;"
| 84 || July 5 || @ Indians || 5–4 || Lowe (4–6) || Rocker (3–3) || — || Jacobs Field || 42,647 || 50–34 || W2
|- style="text-align:center; background-color:#fbb;"
| 85 || July 6 || Braves  || 5–6 (10)|| Karsay (1–1) || Kim (0–1) || Cabrera (2) || Fenway Park || 33,723 || 50–35 || L1
|- style="text-align:center; background-color:#bfb;"
| 86 || July 7 || Braves || 3–1 || Nomo (8–4) || Marquis (2–3) || Lowe (15) || Fenway Park || 33,355 || 51–35 || W1
|- style="text-align:center; background-color:#fbb"
| 87 || July 8 || Braves || 0–8 || Glavine (7–5) || Ohka (2–4) || — || Fenway Park || 32,677 || 51–36 || L1
|- style="text-align:center; background-color:#fbb"
| 88 || July 12 || @ Mets || 2–4 || Leiter (5–8) || Wakefield (6–3) || Benítez (19) || Shea Stadium || 37,698 || 51–37 || L2 
|- style="text-align:center; background-color:#bfb"
| 89 || July 13 || @ Mets || 3–1 || Cone (5–1) || Appier (5–9) || Lowe (16) || Shea Stadium || 42,219 || 52–37 || W1
|- style="text-align:center; background-color:#fbb"
| 90 || July 14 || @ Mets  || 0–2 || Rusch (5–5) || Arrojo (2–3) || Benítez (20) || Shea Stadium || 52,006 || 52–38 || L1
|- style="text-align:center; background-color:#bfb"
| 91 || July 15 || @ Expos || 8–5 || Nomo (9–4) || Thurman (4–6) || Lowe (17) || Olympic Stadium || 32,965 || 53–38 || W1
|- style="text-align:center; background-color:#bfb"
| 92 || July 16 || @ Expos || 6–5 || Pichardo (2–0) || Lloyd (7–2) || Lowe (18) || Olympic Stadium || 16,005 || 54–38 || W2
|- style="text-align:center; background-color:#fbb"
| 93 || July 17 || @ Expos || 7–11 || Mattes (3–1) || Wakefield (6–4) || — || Olympic Stadium || 13,348 || 54–39 || L1
|- style="text-align:center; background-color:#bfb;"
| 94 || July 18 || @ Blue Jays || 5–4 || Garcés (3–0) || Koch (1–3) || Lowe (19) || SkyDome || 30,449 || 55–39 || W1
|- style="text-align:center; background-color:#fbb;"
| 95 || July 19 || @ Blue Jays || 3–4 || Escobar (2–4) || Lowe (4–7) || — || SkyDome || 30,488 || 55–40 || L1
|- style="text-align:center; background-color:#bfb;"
| 96 || July 20 || @ White Sox || 7–2 || Nomo (10–4) || Biddle (2–6) || — || Comiskey Park || 28,740 || 56–40 || W1
|- style="text-align:center; background-color:#fbb;"
| 97 || July 21 || @ White Sox || 3–10 || Baldwin (7–5) || Ohka (2–5) || — || Comiskey Park || 29,303 || 56–41 || L1
|- style="text-align:center; background-color:#fbb;"
| 98 || July 22 || @ White Sox || 8–13 || Garland (4–4) || Wakefield (6–5) || Howry (4) || Comiskey Park || 26,221 || 56–42 || L2
|- style="text-align:center; background-color:#bfb"
| 99 || July 24 || Blue Jays || 6–4 || Cone (6–1) || Hamilton (5–7) || Lowe (20) || Fenway Park || 33,154 || 57–42 || W1
|- style="text-align:center; background-color:#fbb"
| 100 || July 25 || Blue Jays || 3–4 (10)|| Quantrill (9–2) || Lowe (4–8) || Koch (20) || Fenway Park || 33,030 || 57–43 || L1
|- style="text-align:center; background-color:#bfb"
| 101 || July 26 || Blue Jays || 6–3 || Nomo (11–4) || File (3–2) || Beck (5) || Fenway Park || 32,094 || 58–43 || W1
|- style="text-align:center; background-color:#bfb"
| 102 || July 27 || White Sox || 9–5 || Saberhagen (1–0) || Wells (6–6) || — || Fenway Park || 33,813 || 59–43 || W2
|- style="text-align:center; background-color:#fbb"
| 103 || July 28 || White Sox || 1–3 || Buehrle (8–6) || Wakefield (6–6) || Foulke (24) || Fenway Park || 33,316 || 59–44 || L1
|- style="text-align:center; background-color:#bfb"
| 104 || July 29 || White Sox || 4–3 || Beck (5–3) || Embree (0–3) || Lowe (21) || Fenway Park || 33,375 || 60–44 || W1
|- style="text-align:center; background-color:#fbb"
| 105 || July 31 || Angels || 3–4 || Ortiz (9–7) || Garcés (3–1) || Percival (28) || Fenway Park || 33,909 || 60–45 || L1
|-

|- style="text-align:center; background-color:#fbb"
| 106 || August 1 || Angels || 2–4 || Schoenweis (8–8) || Nomo (11–5) || Levine (2) || Fenway Park || 33,551 || 60–46 || L2
|- style="text-align:center; background-color:#fbb"
| 107 || August 2 || Angels || 4–13 || Rapp (4–9) || Saberhagen (1–1) || — || Fenway Park || 33,661 || 60–47 || L3
|- style="text-align:center; background-color:#bbb"
| — || August 3 || Rangers  || colspan=8|Postponed (rain). Makeup date August 4.
|- style="text-align:center; background-color:#bfb"
| 108 || August 4 (1) || Rangers || 10–4 || Cone (7–1) || Helling (8–9) || — || Fenway Park || 32,249 || 61–47 || W1
|- style="text-align:center; background-color:#bfb"
| 109 || August 4 (2)|| Rangers || 6–2 || Wakefield (7–2) || Davis (5–8) || — || Fenway Park || 32,338 || 62–47 || W2
|- style="text-align:center; background-color:#bfb;"
| 110 || August 5 || Rangers || 6–3 || Arrojo (3–3) || Oliver (9–7) || Lowe (22) || Fenway Park || 32,923 || 63–47 || W3
|- style="text-align:center; background-color:#bfb;"
| 111 || August 6 || Rangers || 10–7 || Fossum (1–0) || Moreno (2–2) || Lowe (23) || Fenway Park || 33,977 || 64–47 || W4
|- style="text-align:center; background-color:#fbb;"
| 112 || August 7 || @ Athletics || 2–5 || Mulder (14–6) || Saberhagen (1–2) || Isringhausen (22) || Network Associates Coliseum || 26,650 || 64–48 || L1
|- style="text-align:center; background-color:#fbb;"
| 113 || August 8 || @ Athletics || 1–6 || Hudson (14–6) || Castillo (7–6) || — || Network Associates Coliseum || 50,863 || 64–49 || L2
|- style="text-align:center; background-color:#fbb;"
| 114 || August 9 || @ Athletics || 0–6 || Zito (8–7) || Wakefield (7–7) || — || Network Associates Coliseum || 28,781 || 64–50 || L3
|- style="text-align:center; background-color:#bbb"
| — || August 10 || @ Orioles  || colspan=8|Postponed (rain). Makeup date October 5.
|- style="text-align:center; background-color:#fbb;"
| 115 || August 11 || @ Orioles || 2–4 || Towers (7–7) || Cone (7–2) || Roberts (2) || Camden Yards || 48,748 || 64–51 || L4
|- style="text-align:center; background-color:#bfb;"
| 116 || August 12 || @ Orioles || 12–10 || Wakefield (8–7) || Johnson (10–7) || Lowe (24) || Camden Yards || 48,037 || 65–51 || W1
|- style="text-align:center; background-color:#fbb;"
| 117 || August 14 || Mariners || 3–6 (11)|| Paniagua (4–3) || Beck (5–4) || Sasaki (37) || Fenway Park || 33,790 || 65–52 || L1
|- style="text-align:center; background-color:#fbb;"
| 118 || August 15 || Mariners || 2–6 || García (14–4) || Castillo (7–7) || — || Fenway Park || 33,186 || 65–53 || L2
|- style="text-align:center; background-color:#bfb"
| 119 || August 16 || Mariners || 6–4 || Garcés (4–1) || Sele (12–4) || Urbina (16) || Fenway Park || 33,548 || 66–53 || W1
|- style="text-align:center; background-color:#fbb"
| 120 || August 17 || Orioles || 5-11 || Towers (8–7) || Wakefield (8–8) || — || Fenway Park || 33,680 || 66–54 || L1
|- style="text-align:center; background-color:#bfb"
| 121 || August 18 || Orioles || 5–1 || Garcés (5–1) || Johnson (10–8) || — || Fenway Park || 31,199 || 67–54 || W1
|- style="text-align:center; background-color:#fbb"
| 122 || August 19 || Orioles || 7–13 || Wasdin (3–1) || Pichardo (2–1) || — || Fenway Park || 33,145 || 67–55 || L1
|- style="text-align:center; background-color:#bfb"
| 123 || August 20 || Angels || 6–1 || Castillo (8–7) || Valdéz (8–7) || — || Edison Field || 22,891 || 68–55 || W1
|- style="text-align:center; background-color:#bfb"
| 124 || August 21 || @ Angels || 8–5 || Cone (8–2) || Schoenweis (10–9) || Urbina (17) || Edison Field || 24,402 || 69–55 || W2
|- style="text-align:center; background-color:#fbb"
| 125 || August 22 || @ Angels || 2–4 || Levine (7–7) || Wakefield (8–9) || Percival (36) || Edison Field || 23,017 || 69–56 || L1
|- style="text-align:center; background-color:#bfb;"
| 126 || August 23 || @ Angels || 7–6 || Garcés (6–1) || Weber (6–2) || Urbina (18) || Edison Field || 27,377 || 70–56 || W1
|- style="text-align:center; background-color:#bfb;"
| 127 || August 24 || @ Rangers || 7–4 || Beck (6–4) || Michalak (6–8) || Urbina (19) || The Ballpark at Arlington || 45,378 || 71–56 || W2
|- style="text-align:center; background-color:#fbb;"
| 128 || August 25 ||  @ Rangers || 7–8 (18)|| Michalak (7–8) || Lowe (4–9) || — || The Ballpark at Arlington || 43,775 || 71–57 || L1
|- style="text-align:center; background-color:#fbb"
| 129 || August 26 || @ Rangers || 4–5 || Davis (8–8) || Wakefield (8–10) || Zimmerman (23) || The Ballpark at Arlington || 26,208 || 71–58 || L2
|- style="text-align:center; background-color:#fbb"
| 130 || August 28 || @ Indians || 3–8 || Burba (10–8) || Cone (8–3) || — || Jacobs Field || 41,408 || 71–59 || L3
|- style="text-align:center; background-color:#fbb;"
| 131 || August 29 || @ Indians || 1–2 || Sabathia (14–4) || Fossum (1–1) || Wickman (25) || Jacobs Field || 41,320 || 71–60 || L4
|- style="text-align:center; background-color:#fbb;"
| 132 || August 30 || @ Indians || 1–3 || Colón (11–10) || Nomo (11–6) || Wickman (26) || Jacobs Field || 40,616 || 71–61 || L5
|- style="text-align:center; background-color:#fbb;"
| 133 || August 31 || Yankees || 1–3 || Clemens (18–1) || Lowe (4–10) || Rivera (42) || Fenway Park || 33,501 || 71–62 || L6
|-

|- style="text-align:center; background-color:#fbb;"
| 134 || September 1 || Yankees || 1–2 || Hernández (1–6) || Urbina (2–2) || Rivera (43) || Fenway Park || 33,084 || 71–63 || L7
|- style="text-align:center; background-color:#fbb;"
| 135 || September 2 || Yankees || 0-1 || Mussina (14–11) || Cone (8–4) || — || Fenway Park || 33,734 || 71–64 || L8
|- style="text-align:center; background-color:#fbb;"
| 136 || September 4 || Indians || 5–8 || Colón (12–10) || Nomo (11–7) || Wickman (29) || Fenway Park || 32,145 || 71–65 || L9
|- style="text-align:center; background-color:#bfb;"
| 137 || September 5 || Indians || 10–7 || Arrojo (4–3) || Woodard (3–3) || Urbina (20) || Fenway Park || 32,029 || 72–65 || W1
|- style="text-align:center; background-color:#fbb;"
| 138 || September 6 || Indians || 4-6|| Finley (6–6) || Castillo (8–8) || Rocker (22) || Fenway Park || 32,500 || 72–66 || L1
|- style="text-align:center; background-color:#fbb"
| 139 || September 7 || @ Yankees || 2–3 || Hernández (2–6) || Martínez (7–3) || Rivera (45) || Yankee Stadium || 55,524 || 72–67 || L2
|- style="text-align:center; background-color:#fbb"
| 140 || September 8 || @ Yankees || 2–9 || Mussina (15–11) || Cone (8–5) || — || Yankee Stadium || 55,316 || 72–68 || L3
|- style="text-align:center; background-color:#fbb"
| 141 || September 9 || @ Yankees || 2–7 || Pettitte (15–9) || Nomo (11–8) || — || Yankee Stadium || 55,318 || 72–69 || L4
|- style="text-align:center; background-color:#bbb"
| — || September 10 || @ Yankees  || colspan=8|Postponed (rain). Not rescheduled.
|- style="text-align:center; background-color:#bbb"
| — || September 11 || @ Devil Rays  || colspan=8|Postponed (9/11 attacks). Makeup date October 1.
|- style="text-align:center; background-color:#bbb"
| — || September 12 || @ Devil Rays  || colspan=8|Postponed (9/11 attacks). Makeup date October 2.
|- style="text-align:center; background-color:#bbb"
| — || September 13 || @ Devil Rays  || colspan=8|Postponed (9/11 attacks). Makeup date October 3.
|- style="text-align:center; background-color:#bbb"
| — || September 14 || @ Orioles  || colspan=8|Postponed (9/11 attacks). Makeup date October 4.
|- style="text-align:center; background-color:#bbb"
| — || September 15 || @ Orioles  || colspan=8|Postponed (9/11 attacks). Makeup date October 5.
|- style="text-align:center; background-color:#bbb"
| — || September 16 || @ Orioles  || colspan=8|Postponed (9/11 attacks). Makeup date October 6.
|- style="text-align:center; background-color:#bfb"
| 142 || September 18 || Devil Rays || 7–2 || Nomo (12–8) || Sturtze (8–12) || — || Fenway Park || 30,909 || 73–69 || W1
|- style="text-align:center; background-color:#fbb"
| 143 || September 19 || Devil Rays || 2–12 || Wilson (7–8) || Cone (8–6) || — || Fenway Park || 29,627 || 73–70 || L1
|- style="text-align:center; background-color:#bfb"
| 144 || September 20 || Devil Rays || 2–1 || Arrojo (5–3) || Creek (2–4) || Beck (6) || Fenway Park || 29,530 || 74–70 || W1
|- style="text-align:center; background-color:#bfb"
| 145 || September 21 || Tigers || 5–2 || Fossum (2–1) || Murray (1–5) || Urbina (21) || Fenway Park || 30,905 || 75–70 || W2
|- style="text-align:center; background-color:#fbb"
| 146 || September 22 || Tigers || 3–4 || Pettyjohn (1–6) || Arrojo (5–4) || Anderson (19) || Fenway Park || 30,871 || 75–71 || L1
|- style="text-align:center; background-color:#fbb"
| 147 || September 23 || Tigers  || 6–12 || Weaver (12–15) || Nomo (12–9) || — || Fenway Park || 31,333 || 75–72 || L2
|- style="text-align:center; background-color:#fbb;"
| 148 || September 24 || Orioles  || 1–5 || Maduro (4–6) || Wakefield (8–11) || — || Fenway Park || 30,114 || 75–73 || L3
|- style="text-align:center; background-color:#fbb;"
| 149 || September 25 || Orioles || 7–12 || Mercedes (8–17) || Castillo (8–9) || — || Fenway Park || 29,726 || 75–74 || L4 
|- style="text-align:center; background-color:#bfb;"
| 150 || September 26 || Orioles || 9–6 || Fossum (3–1) || Bauer (0–3) || Urbina (22) || Fenway Park || 31,603 || 76–74 || W1 
|- style="text-align:center; background-color:#fbb;"
| 151 || September 27 || Orioles  || 2–4 || Douglass (2–1) || Wakefield (8–12)  || Roberts (6) || Fenway Park || 32,719 || 76–75 || L1
|- style="text-align:center; background-color:#fbb;"
| 152 || September 28 || @ Tigers  || 1–4 || Weaver (13–15) || Nomo (12–10) || Anderson (22) || Comerica Park || 32,453 || 76–76 || L2
|- style="text-align:center; background-color:#fbb;"
| 153 || September 29 || @ Tigers  || 2–7 || Sparks (13–9) || Kim (0–2) || — || Comerica Park || 30,089 || 76–77 || L3
|- style="text-align:center; background-color:#bfb"
| 154 || September 30 || @ Tigers || 8–5 || Castillo (9–9) || Lima (6–11) || Urbina (23) || Comerica Park || 29,229 || 77–77 || W1
|-

|- style="text-align:center; background-color:#fbb;"
| 155 || October 1 || @ Devil Rays || 3–10 || Sturtze (10–12) || Cone (8–7) || — || Tropicana Field || 10,775 || 77–78 || L1
|- style="text-align:center; background-color:#fbb;"
| 156 || October 2 || @ Devil Rays || 3–10 || Wilson (8–9) || Fossum (3–2) || — || Tropicana Field || 11,266 || 77–79 || L2
|- style="text-align:center; background-color:#bfb;"
| 157 || October 3 || @ Devil Rays || 10–3 || Lowe (5–10) || Rupe (5–12) || Wakefield (3) || Tropicana Field || 10,985 || 78–79 || W1
|- style="text-align:center; background-color:#bfb;"
| 158 || October 4 || @ Orioles || 5–4 || Nomo (13–10) || Wasdin (3–2) || Urbina (24) || Camden Yards || 43,302 || 79–79 || W2
|- style="text-align:center; background-color:#bfb;"
| 159 || October 5 (1)|| @ Orioles || 5–0 || Castillo (10–9) || Kohlmeier (1–2) || — || Camden Yards || 46,746 || 80–79 || W3
|- style="text-align:center; background-color:#bfb"
| 160 || October 5 (2)|| @ Orioles || 7–5 || Wakefield (9–12) || Roberts (9–10) || Garcés (1) || Camden Yards || 47,927 || 81–79 || W4
|- style="text-align:center; background-color:#bfb"
| 161 || October 6 || @ Orioles || 5–1 || Cone (9–7) || Bauer (0–5) || — || Camden Yards || 48,807 || 82–79 || W5
|-

|Reference:

Note: the Red Sox only played 161 games, as a September 10 rainout against the Yankees in New York was not rescheduled.

Awards and honors 
 Pedro Martínez – AL Pitcher of the Month (May)
 Manny Ramirez – Silver Slugger Award (OF), AL Player of the Month (April)

All-Star Game
 Manny Ramirez, starting LF

Farm system 

In addition to the DSL Red Sox, the team shared a DSL team with the Cleveland Indians.

VSL cooperative was with the Milwaukee Brewers and Minnesota Twins.

Source:

References

External links 

 2001 Boston Red Sox team page at Baseball Reference
 2001 Boston Red Sox season at baseball-almanac.com
 2001 Boston Red Sox Draft Selections

Boston Red Sox seasons
Boston Red Sox
Boston Red Sox
Red Sox